Iowa Highway 163 (Iowa 163) is a state highway that travels from U.S. Highway 69 in Des Moines to US 63 near Oskaloosa.  The Iowa Department of Transportation (Iowa DOT) has signed Iowa 163 from Oskaloosa to Burlington along US 63 and US 34, but it does not officially recognize those sections of road as part of the route.

Iowa 163 is a divided highway with some freeway sections for most of its length and serves as a connector between Des Moines with Burlington.

Route description

Iowa Highway 163 begins at the corner of E. 14th Street, which carries U.S. Highway 69 (US 69), and E. University Avenue in Des Moines.  It heads east along E. University traveling  to Interstate 235 (I-235).  There is no direct access to eastbound I-235 from eastbound Iowa 163.  Traffic must take E. 21st Street to Easton Boulevard to access eastbound I-235.  Highway 163 continues east past the Iowa State Fairgrounds on its way to Pleasant Hill where it meets U.S. Highway 65 at a diamond interchange.

It continues east and meets Iowa Highway 117 near Prairie City.  It turns southeast and meets Iowa Highway 14 near Monroe.  It continues southeast, passes Pella, then continues southeast, meeting Iowa Highway 92 west of Oskaloosa before intersecting U.S. Highway 63 south of that city.

The Iowa 163 designation is then extended along U.S. Highway 63 between Oskaloosa and Ottumwa, and U.S. Highway 34 between Ottumwa and Burlington.

History

In 1926, when U.S. Highway 63 was formed, it followed the route of what became Iowa Highway 163. After U.S. 63 was extended north into Minnesota and Wisconsin in 1934, the route then became U.S. Highway 163.  In 1937, US 163 was deleted and was replaced by Iowa Highway 163. In 1970, the US 163 designation was reused for an unrelated highway in Utah and Arizona.

Iowa Highway 163 was originally a two-lane road. In the 1970s the highway was divided through Polk County east of Pleasant Hill. During the 1990s, the highway began to emerge from a two-lane highway to a four-lane highway as part of an ongoing project to create a continuous four-lane highway from Des Moines to Burlington. The segments of 163 in rural areas were converted to four lanes, but the main highway still went through the city centers. That would soon change as bypasses were constructed around the towns along the route. The first freeway bypass, with three interchanges, opened around Pella on October 17, 1994. Bypasses of Monroe, Iowa (with two interchanges), Prairie City, Iowa (with one interchange and one turnoff), Otley, Iowa (with two turnoffs), and Oskaloosa, Iowa (with two interchanges) were later constructed. The last four-lane segment opened between Pella and Oskaloosa on September 30, 1999. Today 163 is divided its entire length, except for short stretches of undivided highway in the Des Moines area.

In October 2009, Iowa 163 was extended along the completed freeway from Oskaloosa to Burlington, overlapping both U.S. Highway 63 and U.S. Highway 34.

Exit list

Related route

Iowa Highway 163 Business serves Pella, following the old alignment of Iowa 163 through Pella.

References

External links

The Iowa Highways Page

163
Transportation in Des Moines, Iowa
Transportation in Polk County, Iowa
Transportation in Jasper County, Iowa
Transportation in Wapello County, Iowa
Transportation in Jefferson County, Iowa
Transportation in Henry County, Iowa
Transportation in Des Moines County, Iowa
U.S. Route 63